Vic Sprouse is the former Republican Senate Minority Leader in the West Virginia State Senate. Sprouse was first elected to the West Virginia House of Delegates 30th district in 1994 and was subsequently elected to the West Virginia Senate from Kanawha County in 1996 and re-elected in 2000 and 2004. During his period in the State Senate he was minority leader from 1998 to 2007. He graduated as a chemical engineer from Penn State University.  He owned several Curves fitness centers in the Charleston area as well as a political and marketing firm.

Sprouse is the Founder and former CEO of Brickhouse Cardio Club, Inc. a Charleston, WV based fitness studio and franchise specializing in fitness studios offering group classes.

Sprouse is the Federal Funds and Grants Director at the West Virginia Department of Economic Development.

See also

List of members of the 77th West Virginia Senate

References

Year of birth missing (living people)
Living people
Republican Party West Virginia state senators
Republican Party members of the West Virginia House of Delegates
Politicians from Charleston, West Virginia
Engineers from West Virginia
American chief executives
American chemical engineers
21st-century American politicians
Businesspeople from Charleston, West Virginia